The list of shipwrecks in May 1822 includes some ships sunk, foundered, grounded, or otherwise lost during May 1822.

1 May

5 May

6 May

7 May

8 May

10 May

11 May

12 May

14 May

17 May

19 May

20 May

21 May

22 May

23 May

25 May

27 May

28 May

Unknown date

References

1822-05